Potu or POTU may refer to:

People
 Potu Leavasa (born 1971), Samoan rugby union player
 Potu Leavasa Jr.
 Potu Narsimha Reddy, Indian social reformer

Places
 Potu, Goychay, Azerbaijan

Other
 Pershing Operational Test Unit

See also
 Potoo